Aleksandr Grigor'yevich Rochegov (Russian: Александр Григорьевич Рочего́в) (19 February (6 February old style) 1917, Baku, Azerbaijani SSR – 2 December 1998, Moscow) was a Soviet and Russian architect, and from 1992 to 1998 president of the Russian Academy of Architecture and Construction Sciences. In 1991 he was awarded the title of People's Architect of the USSR, and in 1990 he was awarded the USSR State Prize.

Buildings 

 Large projects of multiple buildings along the Leningradskoye Highway in Moscow
 Hotel Leningradskaya, currently the Hotel Hilton Leningradskaya, Moscow
 Design and reconstruction of the city center of Tashkent, Uzbek SSR after the 1966 earthquake
 "Moscovsky" department store on Komsomolskaya Square Moscow
 Russian Embassy in Havana, Cuba (1985)

References 
 "Александр Григорьевич Рочегов", Peoples.ru 
 "Некролог", Stroi 
 "Alexander Rochegov", persona.rin.ru

Soviet architects
Full Members of the USSR Academy of Arts
20th-century Azerbaijani architects
Constructivist architects
1917 births
1998 deaths
20th-century Russian architects